Åse Marie Hagen (born 22 March 1973) is a Norwegian politician for the Labour Party, from Steinkjer.

After the 2007 county election she was appointed deputy county mayor of Nord-Trøndelag. She had behind her a coalition of Labour, Christian, Liberal and Conservative.

References

1973 births
Living people
Labour Party (Norway) politicians
Politicians from Nord-Trøndelag
People from Steinkjer